Lawrence Anderson may refer to:

 The anglicized version of Laurentius Andreae (c. 1470–1552), Swedish clergyman and scholar
 Lawrence B. Anderson (1906–1994), American architect and educator
 Lawrence Anderson (actor) (1893–1939), British actor, father of Michael Anderson (director)
 Lawrence Anderson (cricketer) (born 1974), New Zealand cricketer

See also 
Larry Anderson (disambiguation)